Mans Hulden (Swedish Måns Huldén) is a researcher in computational linguistics currently holding the title of Assistant Professor at the Department of Linguistics of the University of Colorado Boulder.  He teaches courses in computational linguistics, phonology, and phonetic and He is the creator and maintainer of the free and open source finite-state toolkit Foma.

Before moving to the University of Colorado in 2014, he was a Marie Curie fellow at the University of Helsinki, and an Ikerbasque visiting professor in Computer Science at the University of the Basque Country. Prior to that, Hulden received his PhD in Linguistics from the University of Arizona in 2009, and he did postdoctoral work in Helsinki as a Marie Curie Fellow.  His research focuses on modelling and learning natural language structure, particularly in the domains of morphology and phonology. He often employ and develop formal and machine learning methods to this end. 

Dr. Hulden has worked extensively with linguistic applications of finite state technology, modeling of linguistic theory, grammatical inference, and the development of language resources, and is the author of several open-source tools for finite-state language modeling.

Foma (software)
Hulden was the creator of Foma tool that works with automata and transducers. Foma is composed of a compiler, a programming language, and a C library. Writing a set of rules in a special format Foma converts them into finite state transducers and automata. Its implementations is very efficient and it is free software. Foma is a tool for working on computational morphology, but it is also useful in any other type of finite state applications.

Foma contributed decisively to the creation of an efficient version as free software of the spellchecker for Basque language (Xuxen). Hulden did it in collaboration with the basque researcher Iñaki Alegría. Xuxen rules and lexicons were already implemented with the XFST program, but the XFST was not free software. The Xuxen corrector, redefined with Foma in 2011, was able to be fully integrated into free distribution programs. Hence the importance of Foma for Basque language. Later on Alegria and Hulden also carried out standardisation works of ancient texts in Basque.

References

Year of birth missing (living people)
Living people
Linguists from the United States
University of Colorado Boulder faculty
University of Arizona alumni